Tacuarembó Fútbol Club, usually known simply as Tacuarembó, is a Uruguayan football club based in Tacuarembó.

History
Like the inner-country team Rocha, Tacuarembó is a super merge of 21 different clubs, and represents all of the department it is located in, except for the city of Paso de los Toros. The team was relegated to the Second Division after finishing 15th in the 2010–11 season.

Current squad

External links
Official Site

 
Football clubs in Uruguay
Association football clubs established in 1999
1999 establishments in Uruguay